Humphrey de Bohun, 7th Earl of Hereford, 6th Earl of Essex, 2nd Earl of Northampton, KG (March 25, 1342 – January 16, 1373) was the son of William de Bohun, 1st Earl of Northampton, and Elizabeth de Badlesmere, and grandson of Humphrey de Bohun, 3rd Earl of Hereford, by Elizabeth of Rhuddlan, daughter of King Edward I. He became heir to the Earldom of Hereford after the death of his childless uncle Humphrey de Bohun, 6th Earl of Hereford.

Following King Peter I's visit to England, Humphrey participated in the sack of Alexandria in 1365.

His wife and the mother of his daughters was Joan Fitzalan, daughter of Richard Fitzalan, 10th Earl of Arundel, and Eleanor of Lancaster, whom he married after 9 September 1359.

On his death, his estates were inherited by his two surviving daughters and his titles went into abeyance: 
 Eleanor de Bohun (1366 - 3 October 1399); married Thomas of Woodstock, 1st Duke of Gloucester, youngest son of Edward III; mother of Anne of Gloucester. 
Mary de Bohun, who married Henry Bolingbroke, the future King Henry IV of England.
 Elizabeth de Bohun, died young.

References

Hazlitt, William Carew, and Thomas Blount. Tenures of Land & Customs of Manors. 4th. London: Ballentine and Company, 1874. ad
Medieval Lands Project on Humphrey de Bohun, 7th Earl of Hereford

|-

1373 deaths
07
02
02
14th-century English people
Bohun family
Christians of the Alexandrine Crusade
Garter Knights appointed by Edward III